The 2013–14 Biathlon World Cup – World Cup 8 was held in Kontiolahti, Finland, from March 13 until March 16, 2014. A planned mixed relay event was cancelled and replaced with second sprint events for both men and women. The IBU requested the change to keep the number of individual events unchanged after pursuit events were stopped and cancelled due to weather in World Cup 1 in Östersund.

Schedule of events

Medal winners

Men

Women

Achievements

 Best performance for all time
 , 3rd place in Sprint

 First World Cup race

References 

2013–14 Biathlon World Cup
2014 in Finnish sport
Kontiolahti
2013-14 Biathlon World Cup
March 2014 sports events in Europe